Søråsen Ridge is a broad, snow-covered ridge that separates the Quar and Ekström Ice shelves, on the coast of Queen Maud Land. The feature was first mapped and named Søråsen (the south ridge) by the Norwegian-British-Swedish Antarctic Expedition, 1949–52.

References

Ridges of Queen Maud Land
Princess Astrid Coast